Bayt Shuʽayb is a village in Bani Matar District of Sanaa Governorate, Yemen. It is located on the eastern part of Jabal an-Nabi Shu'ayb.

Name and history 
Bayt Shuʽayb is named after one Shuʽayb b. Mihdam b. Dhī Mihdam, of the tribe of Himyar. It is mentioned three times in the Ghayat al-amani of Yahya ibn al-Husayn, with the first mention being in 1025 (416 AH).

References 

Villages in Sanaa Governorate